The following is a list of pipeline accidents in the United States in 2016. It is one of several lists of U.S. pipeline accidents. See also list of natural gas and oil production accidents in the United States.

Incidents 

This is not a complete list of all pipeline accidents. For natural gas alone, the Pipeline and Hazardous Materials Safety Administration (PHMSA), a United States Department of Transportation agency, has collected data on more than 3,200 accidents deemed serious or significant since 1987.

A "significant incident" results in any of the following consequences:
 fatality or injury requiring in-patient hospitalization
 $50,000 or more in total costs, measured in 1984 dollars
 liquid releases of five or more barrels (42 US gal/barrel)
 releases resulting in an unintentional fire or explosion

PHMSA and the National Transportation Safety Board (NTSB) post incident data and results of investigations into accidents involving pipelines that carry a variety of products, including natural gas, oil, diesel fuel, gasoline, kerosene, jet fuel, carbon dioxide, and other substances. Occasionally pipelines are repurposed to carry different products.

 On January 2, three people were injured (one seriously), one home was destroyed, and 50 homes were damaged in Oklahoma City, Oklahoma when a gas leak from a gas main entered a home. Preliminary results indicate that a leak occurred at a weld seam on the gas main. Later, Oklahoma regulators filed a complaint over the failure with Oklahoma Natural Gas. The complaint alleged the utility failed to properly inspect its system following eight previous leak failures in the neighborhood going back to 1983.
 On January 9, a 30-inch Atmos Energy gas transmission pipeline exploded and burned in Robertson County, Texas. Four families nearby were evacuated.
 On January 11, butane leaking from a pipeline storage facility in Conway, Kansas forced a closure of a nearby highway for a time.
 On February 14, a 6-inch crude oil pipeline broke near Rozet, Wyoming, spilling about 1,500 gallons of crude oil into a creek bed.
 On February 16, an explosion and fire occurred at a gas plant in Frio County, Texas. Two employees at the plant were injured.
 On February 24, a 10-inch propane pipeline exploded and burned near Sulphur, Louisiana. There were no injuries. About 208,000 gallons of propane were burned. The cause was from manufacturing defects.
 On March 11, about 30,000 gallons of gasoline spilled from a leaking plug on a pipeline at a tank farm in Sioux City, Iowa.
 On March 22, about 4,000 gallons of gasoline spilled from a 6-inch petroleum products pipeline in Harwood, North Dakota.
 On April 2, the TransCanada Corporation Keystone Pipeline was observed by a local resident to be leaking near Freeman, South Dakota. The cause was a crack in a girth weld, and the amount of tar sands dilbit spilled was about 16,800 gallons.
 On April 12, a pipeline at a gas plant in Woodsboro, Texas exploded, killing two men and injuring another worker.
 On April 17, a 10-inch petroleum products pipeline failed in Wabash County, Illinois, resulting in a sheen on the Wabash River. About 48,000 gallons of diesel fuel were spilled.
 On April 29, a 30-inch Texas Eastern/Spectra Energy pipeline exploded, injuring one man, destroying his home and damaging several others. The incident was reported at 8:17 a.m. near the intersection of Routes 819 and 22 in Salem Township, Westmoreland County, Pennsylvania. Later, Spectra Energy Corp. announced plans to dig up and assess 263 miles of that pipeline from Pennsylvania to New Jersey. Corrosion had been detected at the failed seam four years before the rupture.
 On May 20, a Shell Oil Company pipeline leaked near Tracy, California, spilling about 21,000 gallons of crude oil. The pressure on that pipeline had been increased three days before after a series of repairs.
 On June 23, a Crimson Pipeline crude oil line leaked in Ventura County, California. Initial reports said the spill size was from 25,200 gallons to 29,000 gallons, but later reports estimate 45,000 gallons of crude were spilled.
 On July 6, a Plantation Pipeline line was noticed to be leaking in Goochland County, Virginia. The spill did not reach nearby waterways.
 On July 18, a Kinder Morgan Tejas gas pipeline operated by Energy Transfer Partners exploded at the gas plant on the Santa Gertrudis Division of the King Ranch, about six miles south of Texas State Highway 141. According to the PHMSA incident listing, the cause was “other outside force damage.” The company lost only $380,000 in product, but the total loss in property damage was $13,842,000.
 On August 1, a lightning strike in rural Powell County, Kentucky impacted Kinder Morgan’s compressor station on its Tennessee Gas Pipeline system in Clay City. The company's emergency shutdown system was activated, safely venting natural gas into the air, but a fine mist of oil was spewed onto the nearby highway and land. As a precaution, the road was closed to lay down sand to absorb the lubricant. A nearby homeowner's yard, vehicles and pool were covered in the substance. The PHMSA incident listing shows property damage was $138,750.
 On August 10, seven people died after a gas explosion at a Silver Springs, Maryland apartment complex. Warning signs were claimed, including a smell of gas reported by residents before the explosion, but nothing was done to fix the issue.
 On August 12, contractors were working on one of the main lines in Sunoco Pipeline LP's Nederland, Texas terminal when crude oil burst through a plug that was supposed to hold the oil back in the pipeline and ignited. The contractors were knocked off the platform to the ground, suffering injuries from the fall and severe burns. Seven contractors were injured.
 On August 29, a Sunoco pipeline ruptured near Sweetwater, Texas. The leak was not found until September 10. About 361,000 gallons of crude oil were spilled. The pipeline was just over a year old. The cause was from external corrosion of the pipe.
 On September 5, a pipeline in Bay Long, Louisiana was hit by a dredger, resulting in a spill of about 5,300 gallons of crude oil into the water.
 On September 9, a Colonial Pipeline mainline leak was noticed by workers engaged on another project in Shelby County, Alabama. At least 309,000 gallons of gasoline leaked from the line.
 On October 8, in Jenkins County, Georgia a Kinder Morgan Southern Natural Gas pipeline leak, which "sounded like a jet engine times ten," exploded at 2:30 p.m. and was still leaking three hours later. Highway 25 was closed, visitors at Magnolia State Park were evacuated, the nearby airport was notified, and a warning was sent to Norfolk Southern to stop a train. According to PHMSA, the cause was environmental cracking due to a weld or pipe failure.
 On October 11, two Nicor Gas workers were injured and two townhouse units were destroyed in a massive fire and explosion caused by a gas leak in Romeoville, Illinois.
 On October 17, an 8-inch ammonia pipeline started leaking near Tekamah, Nebraska. A farmer living nearby went to find the source of the ammonia and was killed by entering the vapor cloud. About 50 people were evacuated from their homes. The NTSB determined that the probable cause of the pipeline rupture was corrosion fatigue cracking that grew and coalesced under disbonded polyethylene tape coating. Contributing to the location of the cracking was external loading that caused bending stress in the pipe in addition to the cyclic stresses in the pipe from the internal pressure of the ammonia transported.
 On October 19, a contractor in Portland, Oregon hit a 1-inch gas pipeline during work. Within an hour, there were two explosions, injuring eight people, destroying or damaging several buildings, and starting a fire. Contractors claim a utility locate was done before work began.
 On October 21, an 8-inch Sunoco pipeline ruptured in Lycoming County, Pennsylvania, spilling about 55,000 gallons of gasoline into the Susquehanna River. The river was running high at the time.
 On October 23, a pipeline ruptured on the Seaway Pipeline in Cushing, Oklahoma, spraying the area with crude oil. About 319,000 gallons of crude were spilled. The cause was from prior excavation damage.
 On October 31, a Colonial Pipeline mainline exploded and burned in Shelby County, Alabama after accidentally being hit by a track hoe. One worker died at the scene, and five others were hospitalized, with one of those workers dying a month later. The explosion occurred approximately several miles from the 9 September 2016 breach.
 On November 29, an Enterprise Products pipeline exploded in Platte County, Missouri, burning about 210,000 gallons of an ethane propane mixture. There were no evacuations or injuries. The cause of the failure was stress corrosion cracking.
 On December 2, equipment failure in a Denbury Resources source water pipeline led to a leak of approximately 84,000 gallons of source water into Skull Creek in Bowman County, North Dakota.
 On December 5, a 6-inch Belle Fourche pipeline spilled 529,800 gallons of crude oil into Ash Coulee Creek in Billings County, North Dakota. The metallurgical and root cause failure analysis indicated the failure was caused by compressive and bending forces due to a landslide impacting the pipeline.
On December 12, Transco reported an explosion and fire that severely damaged a facility in Austin, Pennsylvania, resulting in an estimated $15,000,000 in damage to the facility. Internal corrosion was determined to be the cause. 
 Sometime in December, a natural gas pipeline running beneath Turnagain Arm in Cook Inlet near Nikiski, Alaska (southwest of Anchorage) ruptured, leaking large quantities of natural gas into the water.

References

External links

Lists of pipeline accidents in the United States